Nick Simpson-Deeks is a NIDA-trained Australian actor of stage and screen. He is best known for his portrayal of Archie McMahon in the SBS drama series The Circuit, and Rhys Mitchell in Seven Network's Winners & Losers.

Early life
Simpson-Deeks was born and raised in Werris Creek, New South Wales, and attended Oxley High School in Tamworth. He graduated from the National Institute of Dramatic Art in 2001. In 2006 he was awarded a Mike Walsh Fellowship which he used to further his actor training at the School at Steppenwolf in Chicago.

Career

Film and television
Simpson-Deeks was a series regular in both seasons of the award-winning legal drama The Circuit, the second season of Winners & Losers (after guest starring in the show's first season), and the sci-fi series Stormworld. Additionally, he has guest-starred in Five Bedrooms, Fat Tony & Co., Wentworth, Mr & Mrs Murder, Play School, City Homicide, The Strange Calls, Temptation, and The Postcard Bandit.

His film credits include roles in the short films After the Credits, Dropbear, A Simple Song, Shades of Grey and Home. He portrayed Irish rider Pat Smullen in the 2011 feature film The Cup, and filmmaker Billy Name in Jim Sharman's Andy X – a musical film based on the death of Andy Warhol.

In 2022 Simpson-Deeks was cast as James King in the Amazon Original noir comedy series, Deadloch.

Theatre
Simpson-Deeks made his professional theatre debut in Falling on My Left Ear: A Show about George Wallace for the now defunct Railway Street Theatre Company in Parramatta in 2002. The following year, he returned to Railway Street to play the role of Tom in Michael Gow's iconic Australian play, Away. Both productions toured regionally and were directed by Mary-Anne Gifford.

In 2005 he received critical acclaim for his performance in Mark Ravenhill's Handbag at the Seymour Centre. Later that year, he starred in Somewhere – an original musical by Tim Minchin and Kate Mulvany – for Q Theatre.

In 2009, Simpson-Deeks was cast in the ensemble of Jerry Springer: the Opera at the Sydney Opera House as part of Sydney Festival. He joined the original Australian cast of Jersey Boys, in the role of Franki Valli (Alternate), that same year, but left the production prematurely due to health complications. In 2010, he sang the role of Skeets Miller in a one-off concert performance of Adam Guettel's Floyd Collins at City Recital Hall in Sydney.

Simpson-Deeks played the role of Constable Alexander Fitzpatrick in Ned: A New Australian Musical at Bendigo's Ulumbarra Theatre in 2015, and is featured on the show's Official Cast Recording. He reprised the role in concert at The National Theatre, Melbourne in 2017.

He played Chris Bean in the Australian production of The Play That Goes Wrong, and briefly reprised the role during the Australian tour of Peter Pan Goes Wrong in 2019. In between, he toured nationally as Cassius in Bell Shakespeare's Julius Caesar.

Simpson-Deeks has worked extensively with Watch This – a Melbourne-based theatre company dedicated exclusively to the work of Stephen Sondheim – starring in seven of their nine productions to date.

In 2019 he received a Green Room Award for Best Supporting Actor in Musical Theatre for his performance in Falsettos at Melbourne's Chapel Off Chapel. He has been nominated for six Green Room Awards in total.

Other work
Simpson-Deeks created the character of Daniel "Danno" Bookham for the popular educational video game Murder Under the Microscope, and played the role from 2007 to 2012.

In 2018, Simpson-Deeks was featured in the six-part web series Freudian Slip, alongside writer and commentator Benjamin Law.

Theatrical credits
Into the Woods for Watch This
Sunday in the Park with George for Watch This
Peter Pan Goes Wrong Australian Tour
Julius Caesar for Bell Shakespeare
The Play That Goes Wrong Australian Tour
Sweet Phoebe for Both Sides Now
Company for Watch This and Fortyfivedownstairs
Ned: A New Australian Musical for Groaning Dam 
Pacific Overtures for Watch This and Theatre Works
The Parricide for La Mama
Assassins (musical) for Watch This and Fortyfivedownstairs
Floyd Collins for Angel Place City Recital Hall
Jersey Boys for New Theatricals
Jerry Springer the Opera for Sydney Festival and Sydney Opera House
The Turning for Perth Theatre Company
A Midsummer Night's Dream and Much Ado About Nothing for Night Sky Productions
Handbag for Focus Theatre
The Windows Project for Darlinghurst Theatre
Somewhere for Q Theatre
Away and Falling on My Left Ear: A Show about George Wallace for Railway Street

Awards and nominations

*Nominated with Sonya Suares, Nick McInerney, Dean Drieberg and Mel Hillman

References

External links

Living people
Australian male stage actors
Australian male television actors
Year of birth missing (living people)